Jimi Hendrix (1942–1970) was an American guitarist, singer, and songwriter.

Hendrix may also refer to:
 Hendrix (surname)
 Hendrix (film), a 2000 film about the guitarist
 Jimi Hendrix (film), also known as A Film About Jimi Hendrix. a 1973 documentary
 Hendrix Marion "Mutt" Fowler (1918-2014), Louisiana politician and businessman
 Hendrix (crater), a lunar impact crater
 Hendrix, Illinois, an unincorporated community, United States
 Hendrix, Oklahoma, a town, United States
 Hendrix College, a private college located in Conway, Arkansas, United States
 Hendrix Junior High School, a public school in Chandler, Arizona, United States
 Hendrix chord, a chord in guitar playing
 Hendrix the Husky, the University of Washington Tacoma's mascot
 HNDRXX, an album by Future

See also 

 Hendric
 Hendrick (disambiguation)
 Hendricks (disambiguation)
 Hendrickx
 Hendrik (disambiguation)
 Hendriks
 Hendrikx
 Hendryx
 Henrik
 Henry (disambiguation)
 Henryk (disambiguation)